Amanda is a Chilean telenovela produced by AGTV Producciones that premiered on Mega on November 22, 2016 and ended on July 25, 2017. It stars Daniela Ramírez, Felipe Contreras and Carlos Díaz.

Plot 
Margarita Gálvez is a young woman who has suffered a drastic moment in her life, she was raped by four brothers, sons of the powerful Santa Cruz family. 14 years later Margarita returns with a new identity, Amanda Solís, to seek justice against these four brothers. Amanda works in the Santa Cruz hacienda as Catalina Minardi's nurse and quickly starts to earn the appreciation and trust of the family, without anyone suspecting her true intentions.

Cast 
 Daniela Ramírez as Amanda Solís / Margarita Gálvez
 Rocío Toscano as Young Margarita
 Felipe Contreras as Víctor Reyes / Víctor Santa Cruz
 Matías Burgos as Young Víctor
 Carlos Díaz as Luciano Santa Cruz
 Álvaro Gómez as Claudio Santa Cruz
 Rodrigo Walker as Young Claudio
 Ignacio Garmendia as Mateo Santa Cruz
 Joseff Messmer as Young Mateo
 Pedro Campos as Bruno Santa Cruz
 Martín Elgueta as Young Bruno
 Loreto Valenzuela as Catalina Minardi
 Ignacia Baeza as Josefina Undurraga
 Adela Secall as Gloria Cisternas
 Josefina Velasco as Elcira Morales
 Teresita Reyes as Yolanda Salgado
 Carolina Arredondo as Melisa Arenas
 Ariel Mateluna as Leonel "Leo" Reyes
 Otilio Castro as Juvenal Reyes
 Bárbara Mundt as Gladys Aguirre
 Teresita Commentz as Anita Santa Cruz
 María de los Ángeles Burrows as Celeste Cisternas
 Emilia Neut as Pilar Santa Cruz
 Borja Larraín as Diego Santa Cruz
 Jaime Omeñaca as Miguel Gálvez
 Osvaldo Silva as Alfonso Undurraga
 Caterina Espinosa as Bernardita Del Valle
 Sebastián Arrigorriaga as Juan José Palacios
 Camilo Polanco as José "Pepe" Céspedes
 Simón Pascal as "El Negro" Lara
 Francisco González as Guillermo "El Loco Guille"
 Felipe Castro as Gabriel Rubinstein
 Ignacio Susperreguy as Fernando "Feña"
 Mónica Illanes as Andrea Curinao
 Nahuel Cantillano as Daniel Quintana
 Scarleth Flores as La Cirujana
 Ignacio Cárdenas as El Toro

Ratings

References

External links 
 

2016 Chilean television series debuts
2017 Chilean television series endings
2016 telenovelas
Chilean telenovelas
Mega (Chilean TV channel) telenovelas
Spanish-language telenovelas
Incest in television
Rape in television